The 2015 FC Edmonton season was the club's fifth season at the professional level in the North American Soccer League.

Transfers

In

Out

Pre-season

Competitions

NASL Spring Season

Standings

Results summary

Results by round

Match Reports

Fall Season

Standings

Results summary

Results by round

Match Reports

NASL Combined Season

Standings

Results summary

Results by round

Canadian Championship

Preliminary Round

Semi–finals

Squad statistics

Appearances and Goals

|-
|colspan="14"|Players who appeared for Edmonton but left during the season:

|}

Goal scorers

References

Edmonton
Edmonton
FC Edmonton seasons